Eucyclodes divapala is a moth of the family Geometridae first described by Francis Walker in 1861. It is found in Sri Lanka, as well as Taiwan.

The caterpillar is olive green. Its thoracic and posterior segments are purplish brown. It is known to feed on Myrtus species. The pupa is greenish but speckled with purplish brown.

References

Moths of Asia
Moths described in 1893